Live from the Fox Oakland is the second live album from American rock ensemble Tedeschi Trucks Band.  Released on March 17, 2017 through Fantasy Records in both audio and video, the work was recorded on the second night of a two-day September 2016 show in California.

Reception

Live from the Fox Oakland was nominated for a Grammy Award for Best Contemporary Blues Album.

In a review for AllMusic, Mark Deming described the music as "a muscular fusion of blues, soul, rock, and funk that's emotionally powerful and technically dazzling," and noted that "the show captures the group in strong form."

Jeff Tamarkin of Relix called the group "probably the best working rock band in America," and wrote: "this document is a time stamp of one ceaselessly creative collective at a key point in its evolution."

American Songwriters  Hal Horowitz stated that the album "puts you in the middle of the music, making this the perfect way to absorb the impact of the Tedeschi Trucks Band firing on all cylinders in their natural habitat."

Writing for The Arts Fuse, Scott McLennan called the album "a wide-angle lens shot that justly captures the Tedeschi Trucks Band in action," and commented: "So much goes on over the course of Live from the Fox Oakland that the TTB upends the notion of a band 'settling' into a sound. Nothing is settling down here; if anything, the band refuses sit in any one spot — it is constantly in motion, kicking up new ideas as it moves forward."

In an article for Glide Magazine, Doug Collette praised "the obvious sense of shared, joyful engagement on the part of everyone playing at any given moment," and described the album as "a peak concert experience."

 Track listing 

 Personnel Tedeschi Trucks Band Susan Tedeschi - vocals, guitar
 Derek Trucks - guitar
 Mike Mattison - acoustic guitar, vocals
 Tim Lefebvre - bass guitar
 Kofi Burbridge - keyboards, flute
 J. J. Johnson - drums, percussion
 Tyler "Falcon" Greenwell - drums, percussion
 Kebbi Williams - Saxophone
 Elizabeth Lea - Trombone
 Ephraim Owens - Trumpet
 Alecia Chakour, Mark Rivers - vocalsGuest musicians Alam Khan - sarodeProduction'
 Derek Trucks - producer
 Bob Ludwig - mastering
 Bobby Tis - mixed by, recorded by, monitor engineer, guitar tech, stage tech
 Brian Speiser - mixed by, recorded by, production manager
 Duncan Lothlan - production assistant, drum tech
 Ryan Murphy - guitar tech, stage tech
 Brian Pirrone - lighting engineer
 Stuart Levine, Vikas Nambiar - photography
 David Trucks - studio operations

Chart positions

References 

Tedeschi Trucks Band live albums
2017 live albums